National Tertiary Route 714, or just Route 714 (or ) is a National Road Route of Costa Rica, located in the Alajuela province.

Description
In Alajuela province the route covers San Ramón canton (San Rafael district), Palmares canton (Zaragoza, Santiago districts).

References

Highways in Costa Rica